Svilen Aldinov Rusinov (born February 29, 1964, in Teteven) is a Bulgarian boxer, who twice competed at the Summer Olympics for his native country. He won a bronze medal in the super heavyweight division (+ 91 kg) at the  Barcelona Olympics in 1992.

Olympic results 
1988
1st round bye
Lost to Andrew Golota (Poland) 0-5

1992
1st round bye
Defeated István Szikora (Hungary) 12-4
Defeated Willi Fischer (Germany) 8-5
Lost to Richard Igbineghu (Nigeria) 7-9

Pro career
Rusinov turned pro in 1999 and fought only one fight, which he won, before retiring.

External links
 
 sports-reference

1964 births
Living people
Heavyweight boxers
Olympic boxers of Bulgaria
Boxers at the 1988 Summer Olympics
Boxers at the 1992 Summer Olympics
Olympic bronze medalists for Bulgaria
Olympic medalists in boxing
People from Teteven
Bulgarian male boxers
AIBA World Boxing Championships medalists
Medalists at the 1992 Summer Olympics
20th-century Bulgarian people